Turners Creek is a  long 1st order tributary to Stewarts Creek in Surry County, North Carolina.

Course 
Turners Creek rises about 3 miles southeast of Pine Ridge, North Carolina, in Surry County and then flows east-southeast to join Stewarts Creek on the west side of Mount Airy, North Carolina.

Watershed 
Turners Creek drains  of area, receives about 47.5 in/year of precipitation, has a wetness index of 341.81, and is about 42% forested.

See also 
 List of Rivers of North Carolina

References 

Rivers of Surry County, North Carolina
Rivers of North Carolina